This is a list of satellite map images with missing or unclear data.  Some locations on free, publicly viewable satellite map services have such issues due to having been intentionally digitally obscured or blurred for various reasons of this. For example, Westchester County, New York asked Google to blur potential terrorism targets (such as an amusement park, a beach, and parking lots) from its satellite imagery.  There are cases where the censorship of certain sites was subsequently removed.  For example, when Google Maps and Google Earth were launched, images of the White House and United States Capitol were blurred out; however, these sites are now uncensored.

Countries engaged with Google Maps
During talks with the Indian government, Google issued a statement saying "Google has been talking and will continue to talk to the Indian government about any security concerns it may have regarding Google Earth." Google agreed to blur images on request of the Indian government.

The Australian government has decided that images of sensitive areas are not a risk, due to poor level of detail. It was reported that in the lead-up to the APEC forum in Sydney held in September 2007 certain key locations in images of the city's central business district, where APEC leaders were meeting, might have been intentionally reduced in resolution; however, Google has indicated that the change was unrelated to APEC, while the NSW police said that they knew nothing about the change in Google's images. Images of the prime minister's official residence, The Lodge have not been blurred. However, images of its roof have been and the entrance to The Lodge is blurred in Google Street View.

The government of Malaysia has stated that it will not ask Google to censor sensitive areas because that would identify the locations it deemed to be sensitive.

List

Most military and defense facilities, along with many private homes, appear blurred in mapping services. The vast majority of Antarctica is also in low resolution due to the bright, often featureless, ice and snow making high-resolution imaging both difficult and largely unnecessary.  The following is a partial list of notable known map sections that have been blurred or blanked.

Antarctica

Asia

Europe

North America

South America

See also
Cartographic censorship

References

Google Maps
Internet censorship
Cartographic censorship